Meluco District is a district of Cabo Delgado Province in northern Mozambique. It covers 5,799 km² with 26,221 inhabitants.

External links
Government profile 

Districts in Cabo Delgado Province